Francis Bryce OBE (January/March 1876 in Bystock, St Thomas, Devon – 2 February 1951 in Bermuda) was a British military officer and the son of John Pablo Bryce, a member of the British gentry who served as sheriff of Devon.

Family
Bryce was born in 1876 and was the son of John Pablo Bryce and María de las Mercedes González de Candamo y Iriarte, who was the sister of Manuel González de Candamo e Iriarte (1841–1904), President of Peru (1903–1904).

Biography
Bryce held the rank of Major in the service of the King's Royal Rifle Corps. He was also an officer of the Order of the British Empire. He lived in Hamilton, Bermuda.

Marriage and issue
Bryce married on 11 October 1935 in New York City, USA - Gladys Jean Mosley (1905-1992) and was the father of at least one daughter: 
 Janet Mercedes Bryce (Bermuda, 29 September 1937), who married on 17 November 1960 at St. Andrew's Church, Frognal, London, David Mountbatten, 3rd Marquess of Milford Haven

References

1876 births
King's Royal Rifle Corps officers
Officers of the Order of the British Empire
1951 deaths
English people of Peruvian descent
Military personnel from Exeter